On July 15th, 1996, President Bill Clinton issued Executive Order 13010. This executive order addressed the concerns regarding infrastructure by listing critical infrastructures, identifying threats to critical infrastructures, and establishing the President's Commission on Critical Infrastructure Protection.

Critical Infrastructure 
Critical Infrastructure stated in EO 13010:
 Telecommunications
 Electrical Power Systems
 Gas and Oil Storage and Transportation
 Banking and Finance
 Transportation
 Water Supply Systems
 Emergency Services
 Medical
 Police
 Fire
 Rescue
 Continuity of Government

Threats 
Threats to critical infrastructures stated in EO 13010:
 Physical  Threats to tangible property
 Cyber  Threats of electronic, radio-frequency, or computer-based attacks on the information or communications components that control critical infrastructures

Literary Mention 

Arthur C. Clarke said in the "Sources" section of his novel, 3001: The Final Odyssey;

"As the result of a series of Senate Hearings on Computer Security in June 1996, on 15 July 1996 President Clinton signed Executive Order 13010 to deal with 'computer-based attacks on the information or communications components that control critical infrastructures ("cyber threats").' This will set up a task force to counter cyberterrorism, and will have representatives from the CIA, NSA, defense agencies, etc."

References 

13010
1996 in American law